Herne  is a village in South East England, divided by the Thanet Way from the seaside resort of Herne Bay. Administratively it is in the civil parish of Herne and Broomfield in Kent. Between Herne and Broomfield is the former hamlet of Hunters Forstal. Herne Common lies to the south on the A291 road.

The hamlet of Bullockstone is about one mile to the west.

History

Medieval history
Archaeological excavations inside St Martin's Church at Herne in 1976 indicated that the first church there was similar to the earliest, Anglo-Saxon examples in Kent, such as those at Rochester, Canterbury, Reculver and Lyminge, and consisted of only a nave and an apsidal chancel. The historian Nicholas Brooks noted that the Domesday Monachorum of 1087 or soon after lists Herne as the location of a minster, which is recorded nowhere else. Brooks speculated that this referred to the church excavated in 1976, and that it may have been founded in the 7th or 8th century, but perhaps as late as the 11th century. However, he regarded it as "perhaps most likely that the foundation of a [minster] at Herne should be attributed to the tenth century when attempts were being made to recover from the devastation of the Viking incursions." A church at Herne is recorded as having been a chapelry belonging to St Mary's Church, Reculver, until 1310, when it became a parish church.

Early modern history
In the 15th century Matthew Phillip, of a family based at nearby Greenhill, became a goldsmith in London, rising to become warden of the goldsmiths' guild there, and was Lord Mayor of London from 1463 to 1464. He also owned Hawe Manor, a little under half a mile (733 m) north-east of Herne. His second wife Christina was probably buried in a chapel dedicated to St John the Baptist, on the north side of the church, where a monumental brass was placed in her memory, dated 1470. Hawe Manor was later home to John Fineux, Lord Chief Justice of the King's Bench from 1495 to 1526. NIcholas Ridley was appointed vicar of Herne in 1538 by Archbishop Thomas Cranmer, who frequently occupied nearby  Ford Palace, and collaborated with Ridley on the Forty-two articles of Religion; Ridley held the position until 1550.

Amenities
Herne has infant and junior schools, and a post office.

The Butchers Arms micropub opened in Herne in 2005.

In popular culture

Author Russell Hoban repurposes Bullockstone as "Bollock Stoanes" in his 1980, post apocalyptic novel Riddley Walker.

References

Bibliography

External links

 Herne and Broomfield Parish Council website

Villages in Kent
City of Canterbury